Starokubovo (İśke Qobaw) is a rural locality (a selo) in Chuvash-Kubovsky Selsoviet, Iglinsky District, Bashkortostan, Russia. The population was 639 as of 2010. There are 19 streets.

Geography 
Starokubovo is located 9 km east of Iglino (the district's administrative centre) by road. Iglino is the nearest rural locality.

References 

Rural localities in Iglinsky District